The following outline is provided as an overview of and topical guide to Andorra:

Principality of Andorra – small landlocked sovereign country located in the eastern Pyrenees Mountains of Southern Europe and bordered by Spain and France.  Once isolated, it is currently a prosperous country mainly because of tourism and its status as a tax haven. The people of Andorra are currently listed as having the eighth highest human life expectancy on Earth, at an average of 82.9 years at birth (2017 est).

General reference

 Pronunciation: , 
 Common English country name: Andorra
 Official English country name: The Principality of Andorra
 Common endonym(s): Andorra
 Official endonym(s): Principat d'Andorra
 Adjectival(s): Andorran
 Demonym(s): Andorrà, Andorrana
 Etymology: Name of Andorra
 ISO country codes: AD, AND, 020
 ISO region codes: See ISO 3166-2:AD
 Internet country code top-level domain: .ad

Geography of Andorra 

Geography of Andorra
 Andorra is: a landlocked country and a European microstate
 Location:
 Northern Hemisphere and Eastern Hemisphere
 Eurasia
 Europe
 Southern Europe
 Iberian Peninsula
 On the border between Spain and France
 Pyrenees mountain range
 Time zone:  Central European Time (UTC+01), Central European Summer Time (UTC+02)
 Extreme points of Andorra
 High:  Coma Pedrosa 
 Low:  Valira River 
 Land boundaries:  120.3 km
 63.7 km
 56.6 km
Coastline:  none
 Population of Andorra: 71,822 (2007) - 194th most populous country

 Area of Andorra:  - 196th largest country
 Atlas of Andorra

Environment of Andorra 

Environment of Andorra
 Climate of Andorra
 Environmental issues in Andorra
 Geology of Andorra
 Wildlife of Andorra
 Biota of Andorra
Ants
Lepidoptera
Non-marine molluscs
 Fauna of Andorra
 Birds of Andorra
 Bearded vulture
 Western capercaillie
 Mammals of Andorra
 Common genet
 Pyrenean chamois

Natural geographic features of Andorra 

 Mountains of Andorra
Coma Pedrosa
Pic de Médécourbe
Pic de Sanfonts
Pic del Port Vell
Pic dels Aspres
Roca Entravessada
 World Heritage Sites in Andorra

Demographics of Andorra 
 Demographics of Andorra

Regions of Andorra

Administrative divisions of Andorra 

Administrative divisions of Andorra
 Parishes of Andorra
 Municipalities of Andorra

Parishes of Andorra 

Parishes of Andorra
Andorra consists of seven parishes:
Andorra la Vella
Canillo
Encamp
Escaldes-Engordany
La Massana
Ordino
Sant Julià de Lòria

Municipalities of Andorra 

Municipalities of Andorra
 Capital of Andorra: Andorra la Vella
 Cities of Andorra

Demography of Andorra 

Demographics of Andorra

Government and politics of Andorra 

Politics of Andorra
 Form of government: parliamentary representative democracy
 Capital of Andorra: Andorra la Vella
 Elections in Andorra
 Political parties in Andorra
 Official Bulletin of the Principality of Andorra

Branches of government
Government of Andorra
 General Council

Executive branch of the government of Andorra 
 Head of state: Co-Princes of Andorra:
 Head of government: Prime Minister of Andorra
 Cabinet of Andorra

Legislative branch of the government of Andorra 
 Parliament of Andorra (unicameral): General Council of the Valleys

Judicial branch of the government of Andorra 

Court system of Andorra
 Supreme Court of Andorra: Superior Court of Justice

Foreign relations of Andorra 

Foreign relations of Andorra
 Diplomatic missions in Andorra
 Diplomatic missions of Andorra
 Andorra–France relations
 United States-Andorra relations

International organization membership 

International organization membership of Andorra
The Principality of Andorra is a member of:

Council of Europe (CE)
Food and Agriculture Organization (FAO)
International Civil Aviation Organization (ICAO)
International Criminal Court (ICCt)
International Criminal Police Organization (Interpol)
International Federation of Red Cross and Red Crescent Societies (IFRCS)
International Olympic Committee (IOC)
International Red Cross and Red Crescent Movement (ICRM)
International Telecommunication Union (ITU)
Inter-Parliamentary Union (IPU)
Organisation internationale de la Francophonie (OIF)

Organization for Security and Cooperation in Europe (OSCE)
Organisation for the Prohibition of Chemical Weapons (OPCW)
Unió Llatina
United Nations (UN)
United Nations Conference on Trade and Development (UNCTAD)
United Nations Educational, Scientific, and Cultural Organization (UNESCO)
World Customs Organization (WCO)
World Health Organization (WHO)
World Intellectual Property Organization (WIPO)
World Tourism Organization (UNWTO)
World Trade Organization (WTO) (observer)

Law and order in Andorra 

 Constitution of Andorra
 Human rights in Andorra
 LGBT rights in Andorra
 Freedom of religion in Andorra
 Law enforcement in Andorra
 Capital punishment in Andorra
Police Corps of Andorra

Military of Andorra 
Military of Andorra
 Police Corps of Andorra

Political parties in Andorra
 Political parties
 Andorran Democratic Centre
 Century 21 (political party)
 Democratic Party (Andorra)
 Democratic Renewal (Andorra)
 Greens of Andorra
 Lauredian Union
 Liberal Party of Andorra
 Parochial Union of Independents Group
 Parochial Union of Ordino
 Renewal Party of Ordino
 Social Democratic Party (Andorra)
 Union, Common Sense and Progress
 Unity and Renewal

History of Andorra 

History of Andorra

Culture of Andorra 

Culture of Andorra
 Art in Andorra

 Language in Andorra
 Spanish language
 Catalan language
 Media in Andorra
 Newspapers
 Radio and television
 Television in Andorra
 Museums in Andorra
 Casa Cristo
 Music of Andorra
 National symbols of Andorra
 Coat of arms of Andorra
 Flag of Andorra
 National anthem of Andorra
 Prostitution in Andorra
 Public holidays in Andorra
 Religion in Andorra
 Christianity in Andorra
 Roman Catholicism in Andorra
 Islam in Andorra
 Judaism in Andorra
 Scouting and Guiding in Andorra
 World Heritage Sites in Andorra

Sports in Andorra
 Andorra at the 2006 Winter Paralympics
 Andorra national rugby union team
 Federació Andorrana de Rugby

Football in Andorra
 Andorra national football team
 Andorran Football Federation
 Football in Andorra

Andorran football clubs
 Atlètic Club d'Escaldes
 FC Encamp
 Inter Club d'Escaldes
 Lusitanos
 Principat
 FC Rànger's
 UE Sant Julià
 FC Santa Coloma

Andorran football competitions
 Andorran Cup
 Andorran First Division

Football venues in Andorra
 Estadio Comunal de Aixovall
 Estadi Comunal d'Andorra la Vella

Andorra at the Olympics
 Andorra at the 1976 Summer Olympics
 Andorra at the 1980 Summer Olympics
 Andorra at the 1996 Summer Olympics
 Andorra at the 2000 Summer Olympics
 Andorra at the 2004 Summer Olympics
 Andorra at the 2006 Winter Olympics
 Andorra at the 2010 Winter Olympics

Basketball in Andorra
 Andorra national basketball team
 BC Andorra

Economy and infrastructure of Andorra 

Economy of Andorra
 Economic rank, by nominal GDP (2007): 147th (one hundred and forty seventh)
 Banks in Andorra
 Communications in Andorra
 Internet in Andorra
 Postal services in Andorra
 Companies of Andorra
Currency of Andorra: Euro (see also: Euro topics)
ISO 4217: EUR
 Andorran euro coins
 Previous currency: Andorran diner
 Taxation in Andorra
 Tourism in Andorra
Hotels 
Museums
Visa policy of Andorra
 Trade Union of Andorra
 Transport in Andorra
 Airports in Andorra
 Rail transport in Andorra

Education in Andorra 

Education in Andorra
 Universitat d'Andorra

Andorran people
Andorran people
 Ramón Malla Call

Andorran people by occupation

Andorran photographers
 Ana Arce

Andorran politicians
 Jaume Bartumeu
 Julian Vila Coma
 Marc Forné Molné
 Albert Pintat

Andorran sportspeople
 Hocine Haciane

Andorran alpine skiers
 Alex Antor

Andorran curlers
 Ana Arce

Andorran figure skaters
 Melissandre Fuentes

Andorran footballers
 Marc Bernaus
 Albert Celades
 Koldo
 Ildefons Lima

See also 

Andorra
 

Index of Andorra-related articles
List of Andorra-related topics
List of international rankings
Member state of the United Nations
Outline of Europe
Outline of geography

References

External links

 Govern d'Andorra - Official governmental site (in Catalan)
 Andorra and its financial system, 2010 -  PDF, English
 Official Tourism Website
 History of Andorra: Primary Documents
 HiT Andorra - Andorra's health care system and general historical and government background information
 U.S. Library of Congress Portals on the World - Andorra
 Andorra. The World Factbook. Central Intelligence Agency.
 BBC information on Andorra
 Culture of Andorra - History, ethnic relations, diet, urbanism, architecture, use of space, and more.
 World Intellectual Property Handbook: Andorra

Andorra
Andorra